Avenue Henri Martin is a station in line C of the Paris Region's express suburban rail system, the RER. It is situated in the 16th arrondissement of Paris.

See also
 List of stations of the Paris RER
 List of stations of the Paris Métro

External links

 

Buildings and structures in the 16th arrondissement of Paris
Railway stations in France opened in 1854
Réseau Express Régional stations
Railway stations in Paris